Clay Township is one of the twelve townships of Ottawa County, Ohio, United States.  The 2000 census found 5,118 people in the township, 2,888 of whom lived in the unincorporated portions of the township.

Geography
Located in the southwestern corner of the county, it borders the following townships:
Allen Township - north
Benton Township - northeast
Harris Township - southeast
Woodville Township, Sandusky County - south
Lake Township, Wood County - southwest
Troy Township, Wood County - west

The village of Genoa is located in the center of the township, and the unincorporated communities of Forest Park and Martin lie in the township's northwest and northeast respectively.

Name and history
Clay Township was named after statesman Henry Clay.  It is one of nine Clay Townships statewide.

Government
The township is governed by a three-member board of trustees, who are elected in November of odd-numbered years to a four-year term beginning on the following January 1. Two are elected in the year after the presidential election and one is elected in the year before it. There is also an elected township fiscal officer, who serves a four-year term beginning on April 1 of the year after the election, which is held in November of the year before the presidential election. Vacancies in the fiscal officership or on the board of trustees are filled by the remaining trustees.

References

External links
County website

Townships in Ottawa County, Ohio
Townships in Ohio